Wojsław  is a village in the administrative district of Gmina Grodków, within Brzeg County, Opole Voivodeship, in south-western Poland.

The village has an approximate population of 320.

References

Villages in Brzeg County